The Connecticut State Soccer Association (CSSA) is the governing body of soccer in the state of Connecticut. The association also runs the Connecticut Soccer Hall of Fame.

References

External links
 Connecticut State Soccer Association
 CSSA on Facebook

State Soccer Associations
Soccer in Connecticut
1913 establishments in Connecticut
Non-profit organizations based in Connecticut
Organizations based in Connecticut
Sports organizations established in 1913
Farmington, Connecticut